The 3rd season of Taniec z Gwiazdami, the Polish edition of Dancing With the Stars, started on 5 March 2006 and ended on 14 May 2006. It was broadcast by TVN. Katarzyna Skrzynecka and Hubert Urbański continued as the hosts, and the judges were: Iwona Szymańska-Pavlović, Zbigniew Wodecki, Beata Tyszkiewicz and Piotr Galiński.

Couples

Scores

Red numbers indicate the lowest score for each week.
Green numbers indicate the highest score for each week.
 indicates the couple eliminated that week.
 indicates the returning couple that finished in the bottom two.
 indicates the winning couple of the week.
 indicates the runner-up of the week.

Notes:
Week 1: Robert Rozmus scored 32 out of 40 for his Cha-cha-cha and it was the highest score in Week 1. Paolo Cozza got the lowest score in history of the show, scoring 18 out of 40 for his Waltz. There was no elimination this week.

Week 2: Rafał Mroczek scored 33 out of 40 on his second dance (Quickstep). It was the highest score in Week 2. Paolo Cozza got 19 points for his Rumba, making it the lowest score of the week. Paolo & Kamila were eliminated.

Week 3: Joanna Koroniewska scored 35 out of 40 on her third dance (Tango). It was the highest score in Week 3. Renata Dancewicz got 26 points for her Tango, making it the lowest score of the week. Tomasz & Blanka were eliminated despite being 2 points from the bottom.

Week 4: Robert Rozmus scored 36 out of 40 on his 4th dance (Foxtrot). It was the highest score in Week 4. Rafał Cieszyński got 22 points for his Paso Doble, making it the lowest score of the week. Rafał & Magdalena were eliminated.

Week 5: Rafał Mroczek and Joanna Jabłczyńska scored 36 out of 40 on their 5th dance (Samba). It was the highest score in Week 5. Renata Dancewicz got 26 points for her Samba, making it the lowest score of the week. Aneta & Robert were eliminated.

Week 6: All couples danced to songs from famous musicals. Rafał Mroczek received the first perfect score of the season for his Waltz. Renata Dancewicz got 28 points for her Cha-cha-cha, making it the lowest score of the week. Reneta & Marcin were eliminated.

Week 7: All couples danced to songs from famous TV series. Rafał Mroczek scored 39 out of 40 for his Rumba. It was the highest score in Week 7. Joanna Koroniewska got 29 points for her Foxtrot, making it the lowest score of the week. Robert & Anna were eliminated despite being 4 points from the bottom.

Week 8: All couples danced to the most famous songs of the rock band The Beatles. Rafał Mroczek received his second perfect score for the Jive and Joanna Jabłczyńska received her first perfect score for the Waltz. Rafał Mroczek also got 30 points for his Tango, making it the lowest score of the week. Joanna & Piotr were eliminated despite being 4 points from the bottom.

Week 9: Aleksandra Kwaśniewska scored 37 out of 40 for her Rumba and 39 out of 40 for her Quickstep. It was the highest score in Week 9. Joanna & Robert were eliminated.

Week 10: Rafał Mroczek received his third perfect score for the Freestyle and Aleksandra Kwaśniewska received her first and second perfect score for the Tango and Freestyle. Rafał Mroczek became the third winner in the history of the show. This is the third time the season's winner was on the first place on the judges' general scoreboard.

Average Chart

Average Dance Chart

Highest and lowest scoring performances
The best and worst performances in each dance according to the judges' marks are as follows:

The Best Score (40)

Episodes

Week 1
Individual judges scores in charts below (given in parentheses) are listed in this order from left to right: Iwona Pavlović, Zbigniew Wodecki, Beata Tyszkiewicz, Piotr Galiński.

Running order

Week 2
Individual judges scores in charts below (given in parentheses) are listed in this order from left to right: Iwona Pavlović, Zbigniew Wodecki, Beata Tyszkiewicz, Piotr Galiński.

Running order

Week 3
Individual judges scores in charts below (given in parentheses) are listed in this order from left to right: Iwona Pavlović, Zbigniew Wodecki, Beata Tyszkiewicz, Piotr Galiński.

Running order

Week 4
Individual judges scores in charts below (given in parentheses) are listed in this order from left to right: Iwona Pavlović, Zbigniew Wodecki, Beata Tyszkiewicz, Piotr Galiński.

Running order

Week 5
Individual judges scores in charts below (given in parentheses) are listed in this order from left to right: Iwona Pavlović, Zbigniew Wodecki, Beata Tyszkiewicz, Piotr Galiński.

Running order

Week 6: Musical Week
Individual judges scores in charts below (given in parentheses) are listed in this order from left to right: Iwona Pavlović, Zbigniew Wodecki, Beata Tyszkiewicz, Piotr Galiński.

Running order

Week 7: TV Series' Themes Week
Individual judges scores in charts below (given in parentheses) are listed in this order from left to right: Iwona Pavlović, Zbigniew Wodecki, Beata Tyszkiewicz, Piotr Galiński.

Running order

Week 8: The Beatles Week
Individual judges scores in charts below (given in parentheses) are listed in this order from left to right: Iwona Pavlović, Zbigniew Wodecki, Beata Tyszkiewicz, Piotr Galiński.

Running order

Week 9
Individual judges scores in charts below (given in parentheses) are listed in this order from left to right: Iwona Pavlović, Zbigniew Wodecki, Beata Tyszkiewicz, Piotr Galiński.

Running order

Week 10: Final
Individual judges scores in charts below (given in parentheses) are listed in this order from left to right: Iwona Pavlović, Zbigniew Wodecki, Beata Tyszkiewicz, Piotr Galiński.

Running order

Other Dances

Dance Schedule
The celebrities and professional partners danced one of these routines for each corresponding week.
 Week 1: Cha-Cha-Cha or Waltz
 Week 2: Rumba or Quickstep
 Week 3: Jive or Tango
 Week 4: Paso Doble or Foxtrot
 Week 5: Samba
 Week 6: One unlearned dance (Musical Week)
 Week 7: One unlearned dance & Group Viennese Waltz (TV Series Song Week)
 Week 8: One unlearned dance & one repeated dance (The Beatles Week)
 Week 9: One unlearned dance & one repeated dance
 Week 10: Favorite Latin dance, favorite Ballroom dance & Freestyle

Dances Chart

 Highest scoring dance
 Lowest scoring dance
 Performed, but not scored

Episode results

 This couple came in first place with the judges.
 This couple came in first place with the judges and gained the highest number of viewers' votes.
 This couple gained the highest number of viewers' votes.
 This couple came in last place with the judges and gained the highest number of viewers' votes.
 This couple came in last place with the judges.
 This couple came in last place with the judges and was eliminated.
 This couple was eliminated.
 This couple won the competition.
 This couple came in second in the competition.
 This couple came in third in the competition.

Audience voting results

Guest performances

Rating Figures

References

External links
 Official Site - Taniec z gwiazdami
 Taniec z gwiazdami on Polish Wikipedia

Season 03